Chanod is a census town in Valsad district  in the state of Gujarat, India.

Demographics
At the 2001 Indian census, Chanod had a population of 31,252. Males constituted 61% of the population and females 39%. Chanod had an average literacy rate of 72%, higher than the national average of 59.5%; with male literacy of 80% and female literacy of 60%. 16% of the population were under 6 years of age.

References

Cities and towns in Valsad district